Martin Petkov (born 15 January 2001) is a Bulgarian footballer who plays as a winger.

Career statistics

Club

References

External links
 
 Profile at Levskisofia.info
 Profile at Etarvt.bg

Living people
2001 births
Bulgarian footballers
Bulgaria youth international footballers
PFC Levski Sofia players
FC Lokomotiv Gorna Oryahovitsa players
First Professional Football League (Bulgaria) players
Association football forwards
Footballers from Sofia
SFC Etar Veliko Tarnovo players